Jeffrey Adams (born November 15, 1970, in Mississauga, Ontario)  is a Canadian lawyer, and a former Paralympian, a six-time world champion in wheelchair sports.

Competitive racing
Adams competed at six consecutive Summer Paralympics from 1988 to 2008, winning a total of three gold, four silver, and six bronze medals. At the 1988 Summer Paralympics he won two bronze medals, one in the 800m race and one in the 1500m race. Four years later at the Barcelona Games he won two silvers, one in the 800m  race and one as part of the 4 × 400 m relay. At the 1996 Summer Paralympics he won gold in the 800 m, silver in the 400 m, and bronze in the 4×400 m relay. Four years later, at the Sydney games, he won five medals, a gold in the 800 m and 1500 m, a silver in the 400 m and a bronze in the 5000 m and 4x100 m. At the 2004 Paralympics he won a bronze in the 400 m race. Adams was coached by Peter Eriksson.

Post-competition
In 2002, Adams ascended the 1,776 steps of the CN Tower in a specially-designed wheelchair; in 2004, he climbed the Acropolis.

In March 2010, he was a torchbearer during the 2010 Winter Paralympics torch relay.

In 2012 Adams was part of the broadcast crew on Channel 4's coverage of the 2012 Summer Paralympics in London.

Adams is additionally a motivational speaker.

He is an inductee into the Canadian Disability Hall of Fame (1997, then the Terry Fox Hall of Fame), and Canada's Sports Hall of Fame (2018).

Personal life
Adams underwent radiation therapy for cancer as a child, and aftermath of the treatment led to a spinal injury at age 9 that paralysed him. After retiring from competition, Adams and business partner Christian Bagg co-launched Marvel Wheelchairs with Cervélo Cycles, producing adjustable wheelchairs for everyday use. After Cervélo was unable to secure bridge financing for debt to suppliers, Marvel was taken over and unsuccessful attempts were made to sell it by Cervélo. Cervélo was taken over by PON, and Adams and Bagg launched a new company making wheelchairs called ICON in 2010. An appearance on the CBC reality show Dragons' Den led to a new partnership with a manufacturer, Multimatic, to produce the wheelchairs designed by ICON.

Through much of his career, Adams lived in Brampton, Ontario.

References

External links
 
 
 Jeff Adams pitches on Dragons' Den
 Speaker's Spotlight
 National Speakers Bureau
 "After dominating the track, Jeff Adams keeps pushing boundaries of excellence" episode of Beyond the Win, CBC Sports, May 18, 2021.

1970 births
Living people
Canadian male wheelchair racers
Paralympic track and field athletes of Canada
Athletes (track and field) at the 1988 Summer Paralympics
Athletes (track and field) at the 1992 Summer Paralympics
Athletes (track and field) at the 1996 Summer Paralympics
Athletes (track and field) at the 2000 Summer Paralympics
Athletes (track and field) at the 2004 Summer Paralympics
Athletes (track and field) at the 2008 Summer Paralympics
Paralympic gold medalists for Canada
Paralympic silver medalists for Canada
Paralympic bronze medalists for Canada
Canadian Disability Hall of Fame
Wheelchair racers at the 1992 Summer Olympics
Wheelchair racers at the 2000 Summer Olympics
Wheelchair racers at the 2004 Summer Olympics
Paralympic wheelchair racers
Medalists at the 1988 Summer Paralympics
Medalists at the 1992 Summer Paralympics
Medalists at the 1996 Summer Paralympics
Medalists at the 2000 Summer Paralympics
Medalists at the 2004 Summer Paralympics
Commonwealth Games medallists in athletics
Commonwealth Games gold medallists for Canada
Athletes (track and field) at the 1994 Commonwealth Games
Paralympic medalists in athletics (track and field)
Medallists at the 1994 Commonwealth Games